Ancilla lineolata is a species of sea snail, a marine gastropod mollusk in the family Ancillariidae.

Description
The shell grows to a length of 15 mm.

Distribution
This species occurs in the Red Sea and in the Indian Ocean off Madagascar.

References

External links
  Heinrich Konrad Weinkaff (1837), Systematisches Conchylien-cabinet Bd 5 Abt 1a

lineolata
Gastropods described in 1853